Sadik Hakim (born Forrest Argonne Thornton; July 15, 1919 – June 20, 1983) was an American jazz pianist and composer.

Early life
Forrest Argonne Thornton was born on July 15, 1919 in Duluth, Minnesota. The name Argonne came from the World War I battle. He was taught music by his grandfather and played locally before moving to Chicago.

Later life and career
In Chicago in 1944, Hakim was heard by the tenor saxophonist Ben Webster, who took him to New York to be the pianist in his band. He appeared on some Charlie Parker recordings for Savoy Records in the following year. He toured with another saxophonist, Lester Young from 1946 to 1948, including for recordings. He changed his name to Sadik Hakim, a Muslim formulation, in 1947.

"In the 1950s Hakim played in Canada with Louis Metcalf, toured with James Moody (1951–4), and was a member of Buddy Tate's orchestra (1956–60)." Hakim's debut recording as a leader was in 1962, on an album for Charlie Parker Records that was shared with Duke Jordan. "Around 1966 he moved to Montreal, where he played in nightclubs. He toured Europe for a year, played in a trio at a festival in Duluth (1976), and then returned to New York; he toured Japan in 1979–80."

Hakim returned to recording as a leader in 1973, laying down material that was released by CBC, Progressive, SteepleChase, and Storyville Records. Hakim claimed that he wrote "Eronel", which is usually thought of as a Thelonious Monk composition.

Hakim died in New York City on June 20, 1983. He has a daughter, Louize Hakim, who is an apparel designer in Hawaii.

Playing style
Scott Yanow wrote that Hakim "had a particularly unusual boppish style in the '40s, playing dissonant lines, using repetition to build suspense, and certainly standing out from the many Bud Powell impressionists. Later in his career his playing became more conventional." The Penguin Guide to Jazz compared him with Powell, and wrote that Hakim did not have a characteristic playing style.

Discography

As leader

Main sources:

As sideman
With James Moody
Moody (Prestige, 1954)
With Buddy Tate
Tate's Date (Swingville, 1960)

References

External links
 Sadik Hakim, "Reflections of an Era: My Experiences with Bird and Prez" on AnthonyFlood.com
 Tony Flood, Sadik Hakim, 1919-1983: A Vignette from My Diary on Tony Flood's House of Hard Bop.

1919 births
1983 deaths
African-American pianists
American Muslims
American jazz pianists
American male pianists
American jazz composers
American male jazz composers
Musicians from Duluth, Minnesota
20th-century American composers
American Ahmadis
20th-century American pianists
Jazz musicians from Minnesota
20th-century American male musicians
20th-century jazz composers
20th-century African-American musicians